Burke Island is an ice-covered island about  long and  wide, lying  southwest of Cape Waite, King Peninsula, in the Amundsen Sea. Burke Island was delineated from aerial photographs taken by U.S. Navy Squadron VX-6 in January 1960. Burke Island was named by the United States Advisory Committee on Antarctic Names (US-ACAN) for Admiral Arleigh A. Burke, U.S. Navy, Chief of Naval Operations during Operation Deep Freeze (1956–1961).

See also
 List of Antarctic and sub-Antarctic islands

References

Islands of Ellsworth Land